Coolongolook is a small village in the Mid North Coast region, located within the Mid-Coast Council local government area of New South Wales, Australia.

In the 19th-Century gold was mined in the area.

At the 2016 census, the town reported a resident population of 392. The median age is 51 and Aboriginal and Torres Strait Islander people account for 11.3% of the population.

Coolongolook Public School is located on Lombard Street in the town.

In 1994, the Roads & Traffic Authority considered the environmental impact statement of a proposal for a toll road between Coolongolook and Possum Brush.  The proposal was from Snowy Mountains Engineering Corporation and Travers Morgan Pty Ltd.

References

Suburbs of Mid-Coast Council

Mining towns in New South Wales